Year of the Cycos is a compilation album of bands featuring vocalist Mike Muir, released in 2008. It includes new and previously released songs by Suicidal Tendencies, Infectious Grooves, Cyco Miko and No Mercy.

Year of the Cycos was available exclusively at concerts during Suicidal Tendencies' 2008 tour and is currently available via the band's official e-card and website.

Some tracks are older songs, like No Mercy's "Crazy and Proud" which was originally released in 1987, while others tracks are recent re-recordings of previously released songs, such as Suicidal Tendencies' "Two Wrongs Don't Make a Right" which originally appeared on their 1987 Join the Army album. Year of the Cycos is essentially a sampler of tracks from planned forthcoming releases by Infectious Grooves, Cyco Miko and Suicidal Tendencies. (Their subsequent No Mercy Fool!/The Suicidal Family album, a collection of re-recordings of previously released songs, was released in 2010.)

The Suicidal Tendencies song "Come Alive", heralded as a return to the classic era Suicidal sound from the early 1990s complete with distinct guitar solos, had a music video created for it.

Track listing

Personnel 
No Mercy – Track 8
Mike Muir – lead vocals
Mike Clark – guitar
Ric Clayton – bass guitar
Sal Troy – drums

Suicidal Tendencies – Tracks 1-4, 6, 9, 14
Mike Muir – lead vocals
Mike Clark – guitar
Dean Pleasants – lead guitar
Steve Bruner – bass guitar
Brooks Wackerman – drums
Ron Bruner – drums on "Two Wrongs Don't Make a Right"

Infectious Grooves - Tracks 5, 11, 13
Mike Muir – lead vocals
Dean Pleasants – guitar
Tim Stewart – guitar
Steve Bruner – bass guitar
Eric Moore – drums
Robert Trujillo – bass guitar on "Funny Farm"
Josh Paul – bass guitar on "It's the Groove..."
Brooks Wackerman – drums on "Funny Farm"
Ron Bruner – drums on "It's Automatic"
Monte Neuble – keyboards

Cyco Miko – Tracks 7, 10, 12
Mike Muir – lead vocals
Dean Pleasants – guitar
Robert Trujillo – bass guitar
Adam Siegel – drums
Produced by Mike Muir and Paul Northfield
Artwork by Alan Pirie at Cyberelg.net

Suicidal Tendencies albums
2008 compilation albums